The Changi International Exhibition and Convention Centre (CIECC), formerly also commonly referred to simply as the Changi Exhibition Centre, is a convention center in Singapore located just beyond the northern edge perimeter fencing of Singapore Changi Airport, and had served as the venue for the Asian Aerospace since its completion in 1988 until 2006 when it was managed by Reed Exhibitions.

The Singapore Airshow is now held at a new purpose-built centre, the Changi Exhibition Centre. The status of the current facility is still pending as there are considerations for Singapore Changi Airport to expand and subsume the site into a new facility or other purposes related to it.

Changi
Convention centres in Singapore